Ashley Park is a regional lifestyle center in Newnan, Georgia, United States. The anchor stores are Georgian Cinemas, DSW, Best Buy, Ulta Beauty, Barnes & Noble, Dick's Sporting Goods, Dillard's, Belk, and Onelife Fitness.

Shopping malls in the Atlanta metropolitan area
Shopping malls established in 2006
Buildings and structures in Coweta County, Georgia
Tourist attractions in Coweta County, Georgia

There is a strip mall across the street from the shopping center. The anchor stores at the strip mall are Rooms To Go, Hibbett Sports, Old Navy, Office Depot, Michaels, TJ Maxx, Rack Room Shoes, Target, Party City, Ashley HomeStore, Urban Air Trampoline Park, Dollar Tree, BJ's Wholesale Club, JCPenney, and At Home.